The following is a Mackerras pendulum prior to the 2017 Queensland state election.

"Very safe" seats require a swing of more than 20 points to change, "safe" seats 10–20 points to change, "fairly safe" seats 6–10 points, and "marginal" seats less than 6 points.

See also
Post-election pendulum for the Queensland state election, 2015

References

Pendulums for Queensland state elections